Chhayapuri railway station (station code:- CYI) is a railway station on the Western Railway network in the state of Gujarat, India. Chhayapuri railway station is 6 km far away from Vadodara Junction. Passenger, Express and Superfast trains halt here.

Recently, Union Minister of State for Railways, Suresh Angadi inaugurated the Chhayapuri railway station on 14 December, 2019 in Vadodara. Chhayapuri railway station will now serve as a satellite station of Vadodara to improve mobility and punctuality of trains, reduce vehicular traffic congestion around Vadodara railway station and help in expansion of the city.

Trains

Following Express and Superfast trains halt at Chhayapuri railway station in both directions:

 19167/68 Ahmedabad - Varanasi Sabarmati Express
 19165/66 Ahmedabad - Darbhanga Sabarmati Express
 12947/48 Ahmedabad - Patna Azimabad Express
 19421/22 Ahmedabad - Patna Weekly Express
 12917/18 Ahmedabad - Hazrat Nizamuddin Gujarat Sampark Kranti Express
 11463/64 Somnath - Jabalpur Express (via Itarsi)
 11465/66 Somnath - Jabalpur Express (via Bina)
 19309/10 Gandhinagar Capital - Indore Shanti Express
 19575/76 Okha - Nathdwara Express
 12475/76 Hapa - Shri Mata Vaishno Devi Katra Sarvodaya Superfast Express	
 12477/78 Jamnagar - Shri Mata Vaishno Devi Katra Sindhu Superfast Express	
 12473/74 Gandhidham - Shri Mata Vaishno Devi Katra Sarvodaya Superfast Express
 15045/46 Gorakhpur - Okha Express
 22969/70 Okha - Banaras SF Express
 19489/90 Ahmedabad - Gorakhpur   Express

See also
 Vadodara Junction railway station

References

Railway stations in Vadodara district
Vadodara railway division